Argiope versicolor, the multi-coloured Saint Andrew's cross spider, is a species of orb-weaver spider found mostly in Southeast Asia, from China to Indonesia (Java).

Description
Argiope versicolor is a colorful spider. The female's cephalothorax is covered by silvery hair.
Its abdomen is pentagonal in shape with white, yellow, red, dark bands dorsally, and two longitudinal yellow stripes ventrally. The dark bands are dotted with white. The legs are orange with dark bands. She usually sits head down in the centre of the web, with legs held spread-eagle in an 'X' shape reminiscent of St. Andrew's Cross.

The male is smaller and duller than the female, and brown and cream coloured.

Biology
Like other members of the genus, females sometimes decorate their web with a zig-zag stabilimentum of white silk, which varies in shape from discoid in juveniles to cruciform in mature females. The stabilimentum may be association with predator-avoidance behaviours.

Male webs are not decorated by zig-zag white bands.

Gallery

References

versicolor
Spiders of Asia
Spiders described in 1859